Bebitza(Giugeac) may refer to:

Bebi (vizier), an Egyptian vizier
Bebi Airstrip, an airport in Nigeria

People with the given name
Bebi Philip (born 1988), Ivorian singer
Bebi Romeo (born 1974), Indonesian musician

See also
Bebi Dol (born 1962), Serbian singer-songwriter
Baby (Dragon Ball GT), or Bebī in Japanese, a character in the anime series Dragon Ball GT